Aigai, Anatolia may refer to:
Aigai (Aeolis), city in ancient Aeolis, member of the Aeolian dodecapolis
Aigai (Cilicia), city in ancient Cilicia